Piper High School is a public secondary school in the latent township Piper, Kansas of Kansas City, Kansas, United States. It is operated by Piper USD 203 school district, and serves students of grades 9 to 12.  This school is one of multiple high schools located in Kansas City.  The school colors are purple and white, although black is generally considered a third official color.

Piper High School is a member of the Kansas State High School Activities Association and offers a variety of sports programs. Athletic teams compete in the 4A division and are known as the "Pirates". Extracurricular activities are also offered in the form of performing arts, school publications, and clubs.

Piper High School serves a learning community of 570 students. Piper High is the only high school in USD 203, which encompasses 32 square miles of Western Wyandotte County in Kansas City, Kansas. The student population of USD 203 is 1800 students.

History

Piper USD #203 History.

Piper Rural High School District #1

3130 North 122 Street, Kansas City, Kansas

At the close of the school year of 1919 a community meeting was held and plans for a rural high school in Piper, Kansas were discussed. At the time of this meeting there was no rural high school in Wyandotte County, Kansas. Piper Rural High School District #1 was organized with James Glenn as director, William Einhellig as clerk and W. B. Vining serving as treasurer of the board. This board was given authority to go ahead and map out the boundaries of District #1 and issue bonds for the erection of a new building. It was decided the district boundaries should extend as far west as the Wyandotte/Leavenworth County line and north, east and south to the “opposition,” that is, to a line bounding territory where there would be opposition to voting bonds for the school. Thus the district’s lines are a little irregular. District #1 as platted at that time had a valuation of $1,800,000. One-room elementary schools Brauer, Center Point, Island Creek, Maywood, Piper, Pleasant Ridge, Wallula and Wolcott were located in the district boundaries. Each elementary school was governed by a board of education consisting of three members.  In the fall of 1919 the Piper Rural High School District #1 was opened with an enrollment of 65 pupils in the Woodsman Hall located at approximately 12129 Russell Avenue in Piper, Kansas. The first principal was F. C. Marks. During World War I the federal government asked the state of Kansas to send six of their best educators to France to instruct the soldiers during the war. Mr. Marks was one of the six. On his return to the United States, Piper Rural High School District #1 was fortunate enough to secure him as the first principal.  In March of 1920 the Woodsman Hall burned, so the board purchased canvas and divided the church in Piper into four rooms and continued school for the remainder of the year. The first class graduated in May of 1920. This class graduated the following four students: Delila Barker, Mike Einhellig, Helen Freedle and Dwight Vining.

In the fall of 1920 the school was moved to the new building with George B. Owens as principal.  In 1951 a new gymnasium was added to the existing building. This bond issue passed by only one vote. At the time of this bond issue the total enrollment of Piper Rural High School District #1 was approximately 20 students.

Piper High School

4400 North 107 Street, Kansas City, Kansas

Piper Elementary was built in 1976 with the addition of "old Piper High School" still standing became known as Piper Elementary School. Piper Elementary East was opened neighboring the High School eight blocks away in 1994.  Piper USD 203 has completed its installation of fiber optic networking bandwidth of 1Gb/sec download and upload provided by Google Fiber.

Education

Piper High School (Kansas) is the top performing school in the metro area, based on state math and reading assessments as of May 22, 2016. Piper High once again was awarded the Standard of Excellence by the Kansas Board of Education for excellence in Math and Reading. ACT results remain in the top 10% of all metro schools, and continue to improve. Piper High's Kansas State Math and Reading performance is the highest of ALL high schools classified 4A - 6A in the state of Kansas. Piper High students have the opportunity to take a rigorous curriculum, which includes Advanced Placement courses as well as dual-credit community college courses. Seniors are eligible to graduate with as many as 26 college hours that they have earned through the dual-credit program at Piper High School.

Piper High School is the highest performing school in the state in 4A, 5A and 6A. Piper High School is also ranked in the top 1% of all high schools 1A - 6A in the state of Kansas based on assessment performance.  Sumner Academy of Arts and Science ranked number 1 in the State of Kansas and 69th in the nation in 2009 for best High Schools in America with college ready students. Piper USD 203 shares Wyandotte County's school districts with 4 other school districts. Kansas City, Kansas USD 500, Bonner Springs USD 204, Edwardsville District 7, and Turner USD 202.

Extracurricular activities
The extracurricular activities offered at Piper High School are small and fairly limited due to the school's modest size. The Pirates are classified as a 4A school by the Kansas State High School Activities Association. The school offers a well-rounded debate and forensics season. Throughout its history, Piper has won two state championships in baseball. The Piper Pirates 2012-2013 football team won its first regional bracket, losing to Eudora in the state semifinals. Eudora then lost to Holton at the state championship.

Athletics

State championships

Piper High School offers the following sports:

Fall
 Football
 Volleyball
 Varsity Cross-Country
 Junior Varsity Cross-Country
 Girls Golf
 Boys Soccer
 Girls Tennis
 Cheerleading
Dance Squad

Winter
 Boys Basketball
 Girls Basketball
 Wrestling
 Boys Bowling
 Girls Bowling
 Winter Cheerleading
 Dance Squad
 Boys Swimming
 FIRST Robotics Team 1802 - Team Stealth

Spring
 Baseball
 Boys Golf
 Boys Tennis
 Girls Soccer
 Girls Swimming/Diving
 Softball
 Boys Track and Field
 Girls Track and Field

Notable alumni
 Eric Stonestreet, Emmy-winning actor (Modern Family, 'CSI:Crime Scene Investigation)

See also
 List of high schools in Kansas
 List of unified school districts in Kansas

References

External links
 School website

Public high schools in Kansas
Buildings and structures in Kansas City, Kansas
Schools in Wyandotte County, Kansas